Salobelyak (Russian: Салобелякское) also Salobelyaksky and Salobeljak is a village and rural municipality in Yaransky District, Kirov Oblast, Russia. Salobelyak is situated along the Yaran River and has one village hall, garden park, church, school and 33 small roads according to Google Maps.

History and geography 
Salobelyak's municipality was administered on January 1, 2006 by the Kirov federal government from forming multiple abolished, smaller municipalities into one. Salobelyak's administrative center is its own village with the same name, Salobelyak. As of 2021, Onosov Yuri Anatolievich is the head of the Salobelyak municipality. There are 12 settlements under the jurisdiction of Salobelyak's rural municipality:

 Bakhtinsky (abandoned)
 Verkhoslino
 Komary
 Kushovo
 Magazeyskie
 Nagishi
 Pakhtaevo
 Petukhovo
 Salobelyak
 Urbezh-Kurbatovo
 Cherkaner (abandoned)
 Shulkomuchaksh
 Engener
Salobelyak's village has historical records dating all the way back to 1676, but it officially became a village in 1842, when its church was built. In 1873, there were 120 residents and 21 households in the village. This rose to 250 residents and 52 households in 1905.

Population 
As of 2021, Salobelyak's rural municipality had a population of 741, which was a 3.41% decrease from the population in the previous year. Below is a population table for the municipality:

As of 2021, Salobelyak's village has a population of 544. In 2002, the village's population structure was made up of 61% Russians and 38% Mari.

References 

Rural localities in Kirov Oblast